was an admiral in the Imperial Japanese Navy during World War II.  He directed Japanese forces involved in the Battle of Wake Island.

Biography
A native of Ehime prefecture, Kajioka graduated from the 39th class of the Imperial Japanese Naval Academy in 1911. He placed 6th out of 138 cadets.

He subsequently commanded Kasuga and Kiso.

Kajioka was promoted to rear admiral on November 15, 1940.

Overly confident that the island's defenses had been reduced by air bombardment, his forces suffered heavy casualties in the first phase of the Battle of Wake Island before being forced to retreat. Hayate and Kisaragi were sunk, and Yubari was hit 11 times by shells fired by the Marine defenders. Perhaps surprisingly for the Japanese Naval Command, he was not relieved of his command after this failure, allowing him a second try.

Kajioka was then assigned to command the invasion of Lae, New Guinea in March 1942. He narrowly escaped disaster when the US Navy launched a counterattack across the Owen Stanley Range, which damaged many ships in the invasion fleet, but after troops and supplies had already been landed.

Kajioka was later in the Battle of the Coral Sea in May 1942 as commander of the Port Moresby invasion force. However, the invasion was cancelled before troops could be landed. Kajioka was recalled to Japan, and was sent to the reserves from the end of 1942 through early 1944. He was reactivated, and given command of the No. 6 Escort Division on 8 April 1944. In April and May he commanded the Take Ichi convoy, which suffered heavy losses while carrying two Army divisions from China to New Guinea.

He was posthumously promoted to vice admiral.

References

Books

External links

The Defense of Wake
A Magnificent Fight: Marines in the Battle for Wake Island
Part Three: The Defense of Wake

Notes

Japanese admirals of World War II
1891 births
1944 deaths
Military personnel from Ehime Prefecture
Imperial Japanese Navy admirals
Japanese military personnel killed in World War II
Battle of Wake Island